Marielle Guichard (born 29 December 1963) is a French former cyclist. She competed in the women's road race event at the 1984 Summer Olympics.

References

External links
 

1963 births
Living people
French female cyclists
Olympic cyclists of France
Cyclists at the 1984 Summer Olympics
Place of birth missing (living people)